The 2019 Sierra Leone National Premier League is the 32nd season of the Sierra Leone National Premier League, the top-tier football league in Sierra Leone. The season started on 27 January 2019.

This is the first edition held since the 2014 season, which was abandoned due to the Ebola outbreak.

Standings

References

Sierra Leone
2019 in Sierra Leonean sport
Sierra Leone National Premier League